Conasauga may refer to:

Conasauga, Georgia, a ghost town
Conasauga, McMinn County, Tennessee, an unincorporated community
Conasauga, Polk County, Tennessee, an unincorporated community
Conasauga Creek, a stream in Tennessee
Conasauga River, a river in Tennessee and Georgia
Conasauga shale, a type of shale
Lake Conasauga
Lake Conasauga (Floyd County, Georgia)